Walker McGuire was an American country music duo. Formed in Nashville, Tennessee in 2012, the duo consisted of Jordan Walker and Johnny McGuire, both of whom were singers and songwriters. They released one single for BBR Music Group's Wheelhouse division before disbanding in 2019.

Biography
Jordan Walker was born and raised in Vernon, Texas. He performed locally at various honky-tonks before deciding to move to Nashville, Tennessee to pursue a country music career. There, he met Fairway, Kansas native Johnny McGuire at a songwriters' gathering. The two then began recording songs together, which led to them being discovered by representatives of the syndicated country music radio show Big D and Bubba.

The duo signed to BBR Music Group's Wheelhouse label in 2017 and released their debut single "Til Tomorrow" that same year. "Til Tomorrow" reached top 40 on the Billboard Country Airplay charts upon its release. The song was included on a self-titled extended play also released in 2017. Cillea Houghton of Sounds Like Nashville wrote in her review that " The duo continue on the path modern country music has laid out, sticking to tried and true topics throughout the EP that makes for universal appeal. While incorporating the modern country sound into their music, they also add in a hint of traditionalism". "Mama's Kitchen Table" was also released as a single from the EP in 2018.

In February 2019, the country music website Taste of Country reported that Walker McGuire had disbanded and deleted their social media accounts. At the time of this announcement, McGuire stated that he planned to begin a solo career.

Discography

Extended plays

Singles

References

Country music groups from Tennessee
BBR Music Group artists
Country music duos
Musical groups from Nashville, Tennessee
Musical groups established in 2012
Musical groups disestablished in 2019